Zagiridia is a genus of moths of the family Crambidae described by George Hampson in 1897.

Species
Zagiridia alamotralis Viette, 1973
Zagiridia noctualis Hampson, 1897

References

Spilomelinae
Crambidae genera
Taxa named by George Hampson